The Sixth Finance Commission of India was incorporated in the year 1973 consisting of Shri K. Brahmananda Reddy as the chairman.

Members
The members of the Commission were:

 Shri K. Brahmananda Reddy, Chairman 
 Shri Justice Syed Sadat Abal Masud
 Dr. B.S. Minhas
 Dr. I.S. Gulati
 Shri G. Ramachandran, Member Secretary

Recommendations

 The States demanded the inclusion of corporation tax into the divisible income tax and 1005 allocation of the net proceeds to them. The commission expressed that such inclusion was constitutionally forbidden but it can be reviewed by National Development Council.
 States share was increased from 75% to 80% due to the decrease in the divisible pool as the arrears of the advance tax collection had been cleared
 In view of the increasing integration of the national economy and for eliminating the regional imbalances the contribution factor was kept at 10% in the distribution of share amongst the states. The distribution inter se the states should be on the basis of fixed percentages
 Out of the net proceeds of the income tax, 1.79% should be allocated to the Union Territories

References

Further references 
 
 

Finance Commission of India
1973 establishments in India